Wolfie and the Coat and Hat was an EP by indie rock band Wolfie.  It was released in 2000 via Kindercore Records.

Track listing

References

2000 EPs
Wolfie albums